Oubanguia is a genus of flowering plants belonging to the family Lecythidaceae.

Its native range is Africa.

Species
Species:

Oubanguia africana 
Oubanguia alata 
Oubanguia laurifolia

References

Lecythidaceae
Ericales genera